Astrothelium neodiplocarpum is a species of corticolous (bark-dwelling) lichen in the family Trypetheliaceae. Found in Bolivia, it was formally described as a new species in 2016 by lichenologists Adam Flakus, Martin Kukwa, and André Aptroot. It is only known to occur in this habitat in Bolivia. The species epithet alludes to its similarity with Astrothelium diplocarpum, from which it differs by the absence of pigment in the medulla and in the amyloid staining reaction of its ascospores.

References

neodiplocarpum
Lichen species
Lichens described in 2016
Lichens of Bolivia
Taxa named by André Aptroot
Taxa named by Adam Grzegorz Flakus